Emilio Ycaza (born 10 July 1997) is an American soccer player who plays as a midfielder for USL Championship side Charleston Battery.

Career

Reno 1868
Prior to the 2020 season, Ycaza signed with USL Championship club Reno 1868. He made his league debut for the club on 20 July 2020, starting in a 1-0 away defeat to the Sacramento Republic. Reno folded their team on November 6, 2020, due to the financial impact of the COVID-19 pandemic.

Austin Bold
On March 10, 2021, Ycaza signed with USL Championship side Austin Bold.

Rio Grande Valley
On September 3, 2021, Ycaza transferred to USL Championship side Rio Grande Valley.

Charleston Battery
On December 8, 2022, it was announced that Ycaza would join USL Championship side Charleston Battery from the 2023 season on a multi-year deal.

References

External links
Emilio Ycaza at University of South Florida Athletics

1997 births
Living people
GPS Portland Phoenix players
Reno 1868 FC players
Austin Bold FC players
Rio Grande Valley FC Toros players
Charleston Battery players
USL League Two players
USL Championship players
American soccer players
Association football midfielders
Soccer players from St. Petersburg, Florida